Ottawa (City of) was a federal electoral district in the province of Ontario, Canada, that was represented in the House of Commons of Canada from 1867 to 1935.

It was created by the British North America Act of 1867. It consisted of the city of Ottawa. After 1872, two MPs represented this electoral district at any one time.

In 1892, it was redefined to exclude the New Edinburgh district of the city. In 1903, it was redefined as the city of Ottawa, excluding Rideau Ward. In 1914, it was redefined to exclude Hintonburgh (sic), Bayswater and Mechanicsville neighbourhoods as well as Rideau Ward. It continued to return two members.

In 1924, it was redefined as the city of Ottawa, excluding Rideau Ward and that part of the city lying west of a line beginning at the intersection of the Rideau Canal with the Canadian Pacific Railway in the south, and following the railway, Somerset Street, Bayswater Avenue, Bayview Road and Mason Street, to the Ottawa River.

The electoral district was abolished in 1933 when it was divided into Ottawa West and Ottawa East ridings.

Members of Parliament
Joseph Merrill Currier, Liberal-Conservative (1867-1882)
John Bower Lewis, Conservative (1872-1874)
Pierre St-Jean, Liberal (1874-1878)
Joseph Tassé, Conservative (1878-1887)
Charles H. Mackintosh, Conservative (1882-1887)
William Goodhue Perley, Conservative (1887-1890)
Charles H. Mackintosh, Conservative (1890-1893)
Honoré Robillard, Liberal-Conservative (1882-1896)
James Alexander Grant, Conservative (1893-1896)
William H. Hutchison, Liberal (1896-1900)
Napoléon Antoine Belcourt, Liberal (1896-1907)
Thomas Birkett, Liberal (1900-1904)
Robert Stewart, Liberal (1904-1908)
Jean-Baptiste Thomas Caron, Liberal (1907-1908) (by-election)
Sir Wilfrid Laurier, Liberal (1908-1910)
Harold B. McGiverin, Liberal (1908-1911)
Albert Allard, Liberal (1910-1911) (by-election)
Alfred Ernest Fripp, Conservative (1911-1921)
John Léo Chabot, Conservative (1911-1921)
Harold B. McGiverin, Liberal (1921-1925)
Edgar-Rodolphe-Eugène Chevrier, Liberal (1921-1925)
Stewart McClenaghan, Conservative (1925-1926)
John Léo Chabot, Conservative (1925-1926)
Edgar-Rodolphe-Eugène Chevrier, Liberal (1926-1933)
Gordon Cameron Edwards, Liberal (1926-1930)
Thomas Franklin Ahearn, Liberal (1930-1933)

Electoral history

|- 
  
|Liberal-Conservative
|Joseph Merrill Currier
|align="right"|974
|align=center|x  
 
|Unknown
|Alexander Gibb
|align="right"|25
|align=center|  
 
|Unknown
|Edward McGillivray   
|align="right"|5
|align=center|    
 
|Unknown
|E. Martineau
|align="right"| 1
|align=center|   
 
|Unknown
|Moss Kent Dickinson   
|align="right"| 0
|align=center|   
 
|Unknown
|Philip Thompson  
|align="right"| 0
|align=center|   
|}

|- 
  
|Liberal-Conservative
|Joseph Merrill Currier
|align="right"| acclaimed
|align=center|x  
  
|Conservative
|John Bower Lewis
|align="right"|acclaimed
|align=center|x
|}

|- 
  
|Liberal-Conservative
|CURRIER, J.M.
|align="right"| 1,458
|align=center|x  
  
|Liberal
|ST. JEAN, Dr.
|align="right"|1,213
|align=center|x 
  
|Liberal-Conservative
|AUMAND, Joseph  
|align="right"| 1,101
|align=center|  
 
|Unknown
|SWEETLAND, Dr. John 
|align="right"| 8
|align=center|   
|}

On Mr. Currier's resignation for having infringed the Independence of Parliament Act by conducting business dealings with the government while still a member:

|- 
  
|Liberal-Conservative
|CURRIER, Joseph Merrill
|align="right"| 2,035
|align=center| x  
 
|Unknown
|FEATHERSTON, J.P. 
|align="right"|772
|align=center|   
|}

|- 
  
|Liberal-Conservative
|CURRIER, Jos. Merrill
|align="right"| 1,854
|align=center|x  
  
|Conservative
|TASSÉ, Joseph
|align="right"| 1,748
|align=center|x  
  
|Liberal
|ST. JEAN, Pierre 
|align="right"| 1,353
|align=center|   
 
|Unknown
|BANGS, C.W.  
|align="right"| 1,239
|align=center|   
|}

|- 
  
|Conservative
|MACKINTOSH, Charles H.
|align="right"| 1,692
|align=center|x
  
|Conservative
|TASSÉ, Joseph
|align="right"| 1,557
|align=center|x 
  
|Liberal
|MCINTYRE, A.F. 
|align="right"| 1,229
|align=center|  
  
|Liberal
|ST. JEAN, P 
|align="right"| 1,213
|align=center|   
|}

|- 
  
|Conservative
|William Goodhue Perley
|align="right"| 3,339
|align=center|x
  
|Liberal-Conservative
|Honoré Robillard
|align="right"| 3,207
|align=center|x  
  
|Liberal
|A. F. McIntyre 
|align="right"| 2,389
|align=center|  
  
|Liberal
|ST. JEAN,
|align="right"| 2,368
|align=center|    
|}

On Mr. Perley's death:

|- 
  
|Conservative
|Charles H. Mackintosh
|align="right"|2,454
|x
 
|Equal Rights
|Hay 
|align="right"|1,596
  
|Liberal
|Chrysler
|align="right"| 1,242
|}

|- 
  
|Conservative
|MACKINTOSH, C.H.
|align="right"| 3,029
|align=center|x
  
|Liberal-Conservative
|ROBILLARD, Honoré
|align="right"|2,363
|align=center|x
  
|Liberal
|BELCOURT, N.A.
|align="right"| 1,946
|align=center|    
  
|Liberal
|PATTERSON, J.W.  
|align="right"| 1,287
|align=center|  
 
|Equal Rights
|LEWIS, W.H.  
|align="right"| 770
|align=center|    
  
|Liberal
|NAGLE, R. 
|align="right"| 55
|align=center|    
|}

On Mr. Mackintosh's resignation:

|- 
  
|Conservative
|GRANT, James Alexander 
|align="right"|acclaimed
|}

|- 
  
|Liberal
|HUTCHINSON, W. 
|align="right"| 3,333
|align=center|x  
  
|Liberal
|BELCOURT, N.A.
|align="right"|  2,942
|align=center|x  
  
|Conservative
|ROBINSON, Hiram 
|align="right"|2,751
|align=center|   
  
|Conservative
|CHAMPAGNE, N.  
|align="right"|2,654
|align=center|    
 
|Protestant Protective
|MCVEITY, Taylor 
|align="right"|2,100
|align=center|  
|}

|- 
  
|Conservative
|BIRKETT, Thos.
|align="right"| 4,897
|align=center|x 
  
|Liberal
|BELCOURT, N.A.
|align="right"| 4,524
|align=center|x  
  
|Conservative
|CHAMPAGNE, Napoléon  
|align="right"| 4,507
|align=center|  
  
|Liberal
|STEWART, Robt. 
|align="right"|4,419
|align=center|   
|}

|- 
  
|Liberal
|BELCOURT, N.A.
|align="right"| 6,275
|align=center|x
  
|Liberal
|STEWART, Robert
|align="right"|5,871
|align=center|x  
  
|Conservative
|BIRKETT, Thomas
|align="right"|  4,818
|align=center|    
  
|Conservative
|CHAMPAGNE, N.  
|align="right"| 4,547
|align=center|    
|}

On Mr. Belcourt being called to the Senate:

|- 
  
|Liberal
|CARON, J.B.T.  
|align="right"| 4,474
|align=center|x 
 
|Unknown
|MORRIS, W.D.  
|align="right"| 1,145
|align=center|  
|}

On Mr. Laurier's resignation:

|- 
  
|Liberal
|ALLARD, Albert  
|align="right"| 5,779
|align=center|x  
  
|Conservative
|CHABOT, John Leo 
|align="right"|5,121
|align=center|   
|}

|- 
  
|Liberal
|MCGIVERIN, Harold Buchanan 
|align="right"| 22,087
|align=center|x
  
|Liberal
|CHEVRIER, Edgar Rodolphe Eugèn
|align="right"| 21,107
|align=center|x  
  
|Conservative
|FRIPP, Alfred Ernest
|align="right"|15,829
|align=center|  
  
|Conservative
|CHAMPAGNE, Napoléon 
|align="right"| 15,450
|align=center|  

|align=center|    

|align=center|   
|}

|- 
  
|Conservative
|MCCLENAGHAN, Stewart 
|align="right"| 21,604
|align=center|x
  
|Conservative
|CHABOT, John Léo 
|align="right"|21,281
|align=center|x
  
|Liberal
|CHEVRIER, Edgar Rodolphe
|align="right"|19,725
|align=center|   
  
|Liberal
|WILSON, Norman Frank 
|align="right"| 19,165
|align=center|    
|}

|-
  
|Liberal
|CHEVRIER, Edgar Rodolphe Eugène 
|align="right"| 23,012
|align=center|x  
  
|Liberal
|EDWARDS, Gordon Cameron
|align="right"| 22,950
|align=center|x  
  
|Conservative
|MCCLENAGHAN, Stewart
|align="right"|21,917
|align=center|  
  
|Conservative
|CHABOT, Hon. John Léo 
|align="right"|  21,614
|align=center|    
|}

|- 
  
|Liberal
|CHEVRIER, Edgar Rodolphe Eugène 
|align="right"| 25,721
|align=center|x
  
|Liberal
|AHEARN, T. Frank
|align="right"| 25,632
|align=center|x  
  
|Conservative
|PLANT, Frank Henry
|align="right"|  23,166
|align=center|   
  
|Conservative
|LAFORTUNE, Frank 
|align="right"| 22,579
|align=center|   
|}

See also 

 List of Canadian federal electoral districts
 Past Canadian electoral districts

References 

 

Former federal electoral districts of Ontario
Federal electoral districts of Ottawa
1867 establishments in Ontario
1935 disestablishments in Ontario